Szprudowo  is a village in the administrative district of Gmina Gniew, within Tczew County, Pomeranian Voivodeship, in northern Poland. It is located within the ethnocultural region of Kociewie in the historic region of Pomerania.

The village has a population of 366.

Szprudowo was a royal village of the Polish Crown, administratively located in the Tczew County in the Pomeranian Voivodeship.

During the German occupation of Poland (World War II), in 1939, the Germans murdered some Poles from Szprudowo along with inhabitants of other villages during large massacres in the Szpęgawski Forest, and expelled several Poles, whose farms were handed over to Germans as part of the Lebensraum policy.

References

Szprudowo